Wilmer Crisanto Casildo (born 24 June 1989 in La Ceiba, Honduras) is a Honduran professional football player, who plays as right back for Marathón in the Honduran National League.

Club career
He became a regular in the starting lineup for C.D. Victoria when he was only 18 years old. He usually played right defender, but could also play as a defensive midfielder or a central defender. He played almost every match of the 2007–08 season where he got thirty caps and scored one goal.

After several years with Victoria (in their youth system and the first team), Crisanto sparked the interest of First Division club in Argentina, Godoy Cruz. The team found out about the young player after his teammate at Victoria, Diego Vázquez, suggested him to the directors at the club. The next week, Wilmer Crisanto was invited for a 15-day trial at the club. After impressing the coaches, his contract was finally signed. He was acquired on loan for six months by the team. 

He made his debut for Godoy Cruz with the reserves in a match against Newell's Old Boys on October 21, 2008 when he came on during the second half. He played a great match and was congratulated the next day on the team's website.

Despite his impressive season with the reserves, the team chose not to buy the player after his six-month trial and on December 18, 2008, he returned to Honduras to play with the team that had seen him take shape, Victoria of his hometown La Ceiba. In 2014, he signed for F.C. Motagua of the most important team in Honduras.

International career
Crisanto participated in the Honduran U-17s and played for the Honduras U20's at the 2009 FIFA U-20 World Cup in Cairo, Egypt. He also played for the 
Honduras U23s at the 2012 Summer Olympics.

He made his senior debut for Honduras in a November 2010 friendly match against Panama and had earned, as of December 2012, a total of six  caps, scoring no goals.  He went on to represent Honduras in multiple World Cup Qualifier matches and the 2015 CONCACAF Gold Cup.

Personal life
Crisanto stated in an interview with Diario Deportivo Diez that his idol is Eduardo Bennett because of the success he had while playing in Argentina from 1993 to 2002 with Argentinos Juniors, San Lorenzo (Champions in 1995) and Quilmes.

References

External links

1989 births
Living people
People from La Ceiba
Association football defenders
Honduran footballers
Honduras international footballers
Olympic footballers of Honduras
Footballers at the 2012 Summer Olympics
C.D. Victoria players
Godoy Cruz Antonio Tomba footballers
F.C. Motagua players
Liga Nacional de Fútbol Profesional de Honduras players
Honduran expatriate footballers
Expatriate footballers in Argentina
2013 Copa Centroamericana players
2014 Copa Centroamericana players
2015 CONCACAF Gold Cup players
C.D. Marathón players